Spirits is an album recorded by Japanese pop artist Watanabe Misato. It was released on July 12, 1996 by Sony Music Entertainment.

Track listing 

東京生活
とびだせ青春
My Love Your Love (たったひとりしかいない あなたへ)
熱いふたり
Pain
LOVE IS HERE
スピリッツ
グッときれいになりましょう
キャッチボール
グリーン・グリーン
Life
My Love Your Love (夢であいましょう)

External links 
Sony Music Entertainment - Official site for Watanabe Misato. 
Album Page - Direct link to page with song listing and music samples.

1996 albums
Misato Watanabe albums